Lesticus cupricollis is a species of ground beetle in the subfamily Pterostichinae. It was described by Pouillaude in 1914.

References

Lesticus
Beetles described in 1914